Tanbar Station is a pastoral lease that currently operates as a cattle station in Tanbar, Shire of Barcoo, Queensland, Australia.

The Cooper Creek runs through the property.

Established at some time prior to 1884 by John Costello he sold it to Armitage and Gillately shortly after taking it up. Mr B. Richardson acquired both Tanbar and Abbottsford Station, which is also on Cooper Creek, in 1903. By 1907 the Christian brothers owned Tanbar.

The property was sold in 1911 when it was stocked with 10,000 cattle by the Christian brothers to the Rocklands Pastoral Company for £30,000.

One neighbouring property at the time was Keeroongooloo Station.

Isolated by flood-waters for over a month in 1949, aeroplanes had to conduct food drops to Tanbar and surrounding areas

In 2002 Tanbar was having a poor season and was stocked with 5,000 head of cattle, down from the 24,000 head it was able to carry.

Western Grazing acquired Tanbar, from the Stanbroke Pastoral Company, in 2004 at the same time as Rocklands Station found further to the north-west along the Northern Territory border.

See also
List of ranches and stations
List of the largest stations in Australia

References

Stations (Australian agriculture)
Pastoral leases in Queensland
South West Queensland
Lake Eyre basin